Fabrice Fries (born March 11, 1960) is a French business executive, currently Chairman and Chief executive officer of Agence France-Presse.

He previously held various managerial positions in media companies such as Vivendi, Havas and Publicis Groupe.

Education 

Fries studied at the École normale supérieure (higher education in  humanities), Institut d'études politiques de Paris and École nationale d'administration (class "Denis-Diderot" of 1985). He also holds a masters degree in history from Sorbonne University.

Career 

After graduating from the Ecole Nationale d'Administration, Fabrice Fries joined the French Court of Auditors, as an auditor, before moving to the private office of Jacques Delors, president of the European of Commission.

In 1995, he became the special advisor to the Compagnie Générale des Eaux (now Vivendi) Chairman and CEO, Jean-Marie Messier.

In 1997, he was appointed Head of Strategy & Development of Havas, where he refocused of the group's activities on publishing and press. After Havas' take-over by Vivendi in 1998, it was renamed Vivendi Universial Publishing and Fabrice Fries became its Deputy General Director, in charge of the press and professional information divisions, working with brands such as L'Express, L'Expansion, Courrier international, Dalloz, Masson, Vidal, Le Moniteur, L'Usine nouvelle, L'Etudiant, Exposium, 01 Informatique, le Quotidien du Médecin, as well as several health information brands worldwide. 

In 2002, Fries was in charge of the sale of those assets by Vivendi to investment funds Cinven, Carlyle and Apax.    

In 2004, he joined Atos, an IT services company, as Group Senior Vice-President, in charge of key accounts and market strategy.

In 2006, he was appointed General Secretary and member of the executive committee of Publicis Groupe, the third biggest communications group worldwide. In June 2009, he became head of Publicis Consultants, a Publicis Group agency specialising in corporate and crisis communications.
On April 12th 2018, he became the Chairman and Chief Executive Officer of Agence France-Presse (AFP), one of the world's leading press agencies.

Since taking the helm in 2018, Fries has contributed to AFP’s financial growth with a transformation plan that places a particular emphasis on the Agency’s video and photo services. Furthermore, AFP has continued to diversify its revenues under Fries’ leadership with its world-leading fact-checking service, which saw a dramatic increase in demand during the COVID-19  pandemic with the surge of disinformation surrounding the disease. He is a staunch advocate of neighbouring rights for the press in the face of Google, which he deems a “just fight”, and even "a personal mission, because it is not normal that those that simply relay news profit from it."

Personal life 

Fries is married to Fabrizia Benini, a senior European civil servant at the European Commission (DG CONNECT) and has two daughters. He is the brother of Charles Fries, a French diplomat, currently French ambassador to Turkey.

Publications 

 L'emprise du faux, Éditions de l'Observatoire, 2021.
 Les Grands Débats européens, Éditions du Seuil, 1995.

References 

1960 births
Living people
French chief executives